The 2017–18 season was Pafos's 4th year in existence, and first season back in the Cypriot First Division following their relegation at the end of the 2015–16 season. Pafos finished the season in 10th position and reached the Semifinals of the Cypriot Cup where they were knocked out by Apollon Limassol.

Season review
On 14 December, Pafos announced the signing of Dmitri Torbinski on a contract starting 1 January.

Squad

Out on loan

Left club during season

Transfers

In

Loans in

Out

Released

Friendlies

Competitions

Overview

Cyta Championship

Regular season

League table

Results summary

Results by results

Results

Relegation round

League table

Results summary

Results by results

Results

Cypriot Cup

Squad statistics

Appearances and goals

|-
|colspan="14"|Players away on loan:
|-
|colspan="14"|Players who appeared for Pafos but left during the season:

|}

Goal scorers

Clean sheets

Disciplinary record

References

Pafos FC seasons
Pafos FC season